Bojana Bjeljac (born 10 April 1989) is a Croatian long distance runner. She competed in the women's marathon at the 2017 World Championships in Athletics. In 2017, she won Vienna Half-Marathon and Ferarra Marathon. Those were her first international victories in half-marathon and marathon. In 2019, she competed in the women's marathon at the 2019 World Athletics Championships held in Doha, Qatar. She did not finish her race.

Her marathon personal best is 2:31:26, set in the 2019 Hannover Marathon. As of 2019, she holds national records over 5000 (15:43.73) and 10,000 m (33:08.1).

References

External links

1989 births
Living people
Croatian female long-distance runners
Croatian female marathon runners
World Athletics Championships athletes for Croatia
Athletes (track and field) at the 2020 Summer Olympics
Olympic athletes of Croatia
21st-century Croatian women
20th-century Croatian women